Mascoma State Forest is an area of forested land in Canaan in Grafton County, New Hampshire, on the west side of the Mascoma River. The forest borders the 900-acre Bear Pond Natural Area. Mascoma State Forest is managed by the state of New Hampshire Division of Forests and Lands.

See also

List of New Hampshire state forests

References

Further reading
 

New Hampshire state forests
Geography of Grafton County, New Hampshire